The Washington State House elections, 2010 had primaries held on August 17, 2010 and general elections held on November 2, 2010, determining who would represent each of the 49 Legislative Districts in the state of Washington in the Washington State House of Representatives. Representatives are elected for two-year terms.

The August 17, 2010 election determined which two candidates appeared on the November ballot. Each candidate was allowed to select a party preference, which was "not restricted to... an established major or minor party."

Republicans gained seven seats in this election, leading to a spread of 56 Democrats and 42 Republicans.

Overview

Results

Composition

Election results

District 1

District 2

District 3

District 4

District 5

District 6

District 7

District 8

District 9

District 10

District 11

District 12

District 13

District 14

District 15

District 16

District 17

District 18

District 19

District 20

District 21

District 22

District 23

District 24

District 25

District 26

District 27

District 28

District 29

District 30

District 31

District 32

District 33

District 34

District 35

District 36

District 37

District 38

District 39

District 40

District 41

District 42

District 43

District 44

District 45

District 46

District 47

District 48

District 49

Notes

References

External links
Public Disclosure Commission on Candidates
2010 Candidates who have filed

2010 Washington (state) elections
Washington House of Representatives elections
Washington House of Representatives